Vinayak Damodar Karnataki (19 January 1906 – 19 August 1947) commonly referred to as Master Vinayak was an Indian actor and film director of the 1930s and 1940s.

Personal life
Master Vinayak was born in Kolhapur, Maharashtra, India. He married Sushila. The couple's children are late actress Nanda and film producer and director, Jayaprakash Karnataki who is married to actress Jayshree T.

Master Vinayak was related to many personalities in the Indian film industry. His brother Vasudev Karnataki became a cinematographer while noted film personalities Baburao Pendharkar (1896–1967) and Bhalji Pendharkar (1897–1994) were his half-brothers. He was also a maternal cousin of legendary film director V. Shantaram. Master Vinayak was a good friend of the Mangeshkar family and introduced Lata Mangeshkar to the film industry in his movie Pahilee Mangalagaur.

He co-founded Huns picture in 1936. Amongst his work, he is best remembered for the 1938 Marathi film Brahmachari. It was considered controversial for having the leading lady (played by Meenakshi Shirodkar) in a bathing suit.

Vinayak died in Mumbai in 1947.

Filmography

Dr. Kotnis Ki Amar Kahani (1946)
Mazhe Bal (1943)
Amrit (1941)
Sangam (1941)
Ardhangi (1940
Ghar Ki Rani (1940)
Lapandav (1940)
Brandy Ki Botal (1939)
Brahmachari (1938) ( Marathi & Hindi) ( old)
Jwala (1938)
Dharmaveer (1937)
Chhaya (1936)
Bhikharan (1935)
Nigah-e-Nafrat (1935)
Vilasi Ishwar (1935)
Akashwani (1934)
Sairandhri (1933)
Sinhagad (1933)
Agnikankan: Branded Oath (1932)
Ayodhyecha Raja (1932)
Maya Machindra (1932)

Director

Mandir (1948)
Jeevan Yatra (1946)
Subhadra (1946)
Badi Maa (1945)
Mazhe Bal (1943)
Sarkari Pahune (1942)
Amrit (1941)
Ardhangi (1940)
Ghar Ki Rani (1940)
Lagna Pahave Karun (1940)
Brandichi Batli (1939)
Brandy Ki Botal (1939)
Devata (1939)
Brahmachari (1938)
Jwala (1938)
Dharmaveer (1937)
Chhaya (1936)
Nigah-e-Nafrat (1935)
Vilasi Ishwar (1935)

References

External links

1906 births
1947 deaths
20th-century Indian male actors
Film directors from Maharashtra
Male actors in Marathi cinema
People from Kolhapur
20th-century Indian film directors
Indian male film actors